Melissa Stewart Newman  (born September 27, 1961), also known as Lissy Newman, is an American artist, singer and former actress who appeared in the 1990 film Mr. & Mrs. Bridge, and at the 30th Annual Primetime Emmy Awards.

Career
On the big screen at 7 years of age, her first appearance was in Rachel, Rachel (1968) during the classroom scene, which is not credited. A year later, she appears in Sometimes a Great Notion (1970), as Lissy Stamper, the daughter of Joe Ben (Richard Jaeckel) and Jan (Linda Lawson). In Mr. & Mrs. Bridge (1990), she has a cameo as Young India at the Pool, appearing in silent home movies (at the beginning and end of the film) as a flashback of Mrs. India Bridge, who was portrayed by Newman's mother, Joanne Woodward.

On television, she had a supporting role as Laney, the teenage daughter of the protagonist Betty Quinn (Joanne Woodward), in the 1978 movie See How She Runs.

Personal life

Melissa Newman was born in Hollywood, California, the daughter of American actors Joanne Woodward and Paul Newman, and the sister of Elinor Newman (as a child actress also known as Nell Potts) and Clea (Claire) Newman. She was born on the same day her parents' film Paris Blues was released in the U.S.

She grew up shuttling back and forth with her well-known actor parents between Westport, Connecticut and Hollywood. She graduated from Sarah Lawrence College in 1988.

Newman is married to Raphael "Raphe" Elkind, a middle-school teacher. They reside in Westport, Connecticut, in the 19th-century home previously owned by her parents.

Filmography

 Mr. & Mrs. Bridge (1990) as Young India Bridge at the Pool
 See How She Runs (1978) as Janey Quinn (credited as Lissy Newman)
 Sometimes a Great Notion (1970) as Lissy Stamper (uncredited)
 Rachel, Rachel (1968) as a girl in the classroom (uncredited)

As herself

 Entertainment Tonight (TV series) – Episode dated September 30, 2008
 Entertainment Tonight (TV series) – Episode dated September 29, 2008
 The 30th Annual Primetime Emmy Awards (TV special) (1978)

References

External links 

 

1961 births
Living people
American people of Hungarian-Jewish descent
American people of Polish-Jewish descent
Newman family (acting)